Elsie Jean Dalyell  (13 December 1881 – 1 November 1948) was an Australian medical doctor who specialised in pathology. During World War I, she served in the Royal Army Medical Corps across Europe, and was appointed an Officer of Order of the British Empire upon the conclusion of the war.

Early life and education
Dalyell was born in Newtown, New South Wales to James Melville Dalyell, a mining engineer, and Jean McGregor in 1881. She attended Sydney Girls' High School under its first headmistress Lucy Garvin. and subsequently the University of Sydney, where she studied arts and science for a year before transferring to medicine in 1906. During her time at the university, she was a resident of The Women's College, which she shortly after described as "the most pleasant [time] in my life". She received her Bachelor of Medicine in 1909—becoming one of the first women in the faculty to graduate with first class honours—and completed a Master of Surgery in 1910.

Career
After graduation, Dalyell took a position demonstrating pathology at the university. Her first professional position was as a resident medical officer at Sydney's Royal Prince Alfred Hospital. In 1912 she became the first Australian woman to receive a Beit Memorial Fellowship for Medical Research, which took her to London to complete research at the Lister Institute of Preventive Medicine, for research into gastroenterology in children.

When World War I broke out, she left the institute to join the war effort; she ended up in Skopje, Macedonia, in 1915 to help in managing the typhus epidemic of the time. She joined the Scottish Women's Hospitals for Foreign Service in 1916 and the Royal Army Medical Corps in 1917—together, these commitments took her to France, Greece, Malta and Turkey. The RAMC placed her in charge of a laboratory in the 63rd General Hospital in Thessaloniki, a level of responsibility that had not previously been given to women.  In 1919 she was appointed an Officer of the Order of the British Empire (O.B.E.) and was decorated by the Government of Serbia.  She returned to Australia in 1920.

Dalyell then took up a senior clinician role with a research group in Vienna led by Harriette Chick, describing the clinic as "the most scientific infant clinic" with "the most highly trained staff in the world". There she completed extensive research on paediatric malnutrition-related diseases, including rickets.  In 1923 Dalyell returned to Sydney for a lecture tour, but then found she had very few job opportunities. Her attempt to open a private practice failed, and she was eventually hired by the New South Wales Department of Public Health as an assistant microbiologist in 1924. She was a committee member of the Rachel Forster Hospital for Women and Children from 1925 to 1935.

Dalyell Street in the Canberra suburb of Chisholm is named in her honour.

Personal life
In her later life, Dalyell lived in Greenwich, New South Wales. Her nieces, Elsa and Lindsay "Jean" Hazelton, lived with her until Jean died by suicide in 1931. Dalyell retired in 1946 and died on 1 November 1948 of hypertensive heart disease complicated by a coronary occlusion.

Selected works

References

1881 births
1948 deaths
Australian Officers of the Order of the British Empire
Australian women of World War I
Australian women medical doctors
Australian medical doctors
Australian pathologists
Australian microbiologists
Women microbiologists
Royal Army Medical Corps officers
University of Sydney alumni
20th-century women scientists
Medical doctors from Sydney
Scottish Women's Hospitals for Foreign Service volunteers
19th-century Australian women
People educated at Sydney Girls High School